Angus O'Brien (born 17 September 1994) is a Welsh rugby union player who plays Dragons RFC. He can play as outside half and fullback. O'Brien is a Wales under-20 international.

Angus O’Brien played club rugby for Caerleon RFC at Junior level before beginning his Senior career.

O'Brien made his debut for the Dragons regional team on 12 September 2014 aged 19 versus the Ospreys, kicking 4 penalties in a 15-17 defeat.

O'Brien was released by the Dragons at the end of the 2017-18 season and joined the Scarlets.

Ahead of the 2022–2023, O'Brien was re-signed by the Dragons.

References

External links 
Dragons profile

Rugby union players from Caerleon
Rugby union players from Newport, Wales
Welsh rugby union players
Dragons RFC players
Living people
1994 births
Cross Keys RFC players
Scarlets players
Rugby union fly-halves